was a Japanese lawyer, academic and judge who served as one of the first Judges of the Permanent Court of International Justice. From 1899 to 1930 he served as a professor at the Tokyo Imperial University, where he was an expert in ancient Chinese law and administrative law. In 1921 he was appointed to the Permanent Court of International Justice, where he heard 30 cases, dissenting from the main judgment once.

References

Bibliography

1868 births
1945 deaths
Permanent Court of International Justice judges
Japanese judges
Members of the House of Peers (Japan)
Japanese civilians killed in World War II
Deaths by airstrike during World War II
Deaths by American airstrikes
Academic staff of Kansai University
University of Tokyo alumni
Japanese judges of international courts and tribunals